Kathleen Hochul (née Courtney; born August 27, 1958) is an American politician serving as the 57th governor of New York since August 24, 2021. A member of the Democratic Party, she is New York's first female governor, as well as the first governor from Upstate New York since Nathan L. Miller became New York's governor in 1920.

After serving on the Hamburg town board and as deputy Erie County clerk, Hochul was appointed Erie County clerk in 2007. She was elected to a full term as Erie County clerk in 2007 and reelected in 2010. In May 2011, Hochul won a four-candidate special election for New York's 26th congressional district to fill the vacancy created by the resignation of then-Representative Chris Lee, becoming the first Democrat to represent the district in 40 years. She served as a U.S. representative from 2011 to 2013. Hochul was defeated for reelection in 2012 by Chris Collins after the district's boundaries and demographics were changed in the decennial reapportionment process. Hochul later worked as a government relations executive for the Buffalo-based M&T Bank.

In the 2014 New York gubernatorial election, Andrew Cuomo selected Hochul as his running mate; after they won the election, Hochul was inaugurated as lieutenant governor. Cuomo and Hochul were reelected in 2018. Hochul took office as governor of New York on August 24, 2021, after Cuomo resigned amid allegations of sexual harassment. She won a full term in the 2022 election against Republican U.S. Representative Lee Zeldin in the narrowest New York gubernatorial election in decades.

Early life and education
Hochul was born Kathleen Courtney in Buffalo, New York, the second of the six children of John P. "Jack" Courtney, then a college student and clerical worker, and Patricia Ann "Pat" (Rochford) Courtney, a homemaker. The family struggled financially during Hochul's early years and for a time lived in a trailer near a steel plant. By the time Hochul was in college, however, her father was working for the information technology company he later headed. Her family is of Irish Catholic descent.

Hochul became politically active during her college years at Syracuse University, leading a boycott of the student bookstore over high prices and an unsuccessful effort to name the university stadium after alumnus Ernie Davis, a star running back who died of cancer before he could join the National Football League. Hochul successfully lobbied the university to divest from apartheid South Africa. In the spring of 1979, the student newspaper The Daily Orange awarded her an "A," citing the campus changes as evidence for the grade. She received a Bachelor of Arts with a major in political science from the Maxwell School of Syracuse University in 1980 and a Juris Doctor from the Catholic University of America Columbus School of Law in Washington, D.C. in 1984.

Early political career
After graduation from law school, Hochul began working for a Washington, D.C., law firm, but she found the work unsatisfying. She then worked as legal counsel and legislative assistant to U.S. Representative John LaFalce and U.S. Senator Daniel Moynihan, and also for the New York State Assembly, before seeking elected office.

Hochul became involved in local issues as a supporter of small businesses facing competition from Walmart stores and, in the process, caught the attention of local Democratic leaders. On January 3, 1994, the Hamburg Town Board voted to appoint her to the vacant seat on the board caused by Patrick H. Hoak's resignation to become town supervisor. She was elected to a full term in November 1994, on the Democratic and Conservative lines, and was reelected in 1998, 2002, and 2006. She resigned on April 10, 2007, and was succeeded by former state assemblymember Richard A. Smith. While on the board, she led efforts to remove toll booths on parts of the New York State Thruway system.

In May 2003, Erie County Clerk David Swarts appointed Hochul as his deputy. Governor Eliot Spitzer named Swarts to his administration in January 2007 and appointed Hochul to succeed Swarts as county clerk in April 2007. In an intervention that raised her statewide profile, she opposed Spitzer's proposal to allow undocumented immigrants to apply for a driver's license without producing a social security card, and said that if the proposal went into effect she would seek to have any such applicants arrested. She was elected later in 2007 to fill the remainder of Swarts's term. She ran for reelection on four ballot lines: Democratic, Conservative, Independence and Working Families Party, defeating Republican Clifton Bergfeld in November 2010 with 80 percent of the vote.

Following Hochul's departure as county clerk, a backlog of mail was discovered by newly elected County Clerk Chris Jacobs, who later said that $792,571 in checks were found in the backlogged mail. As county clerk, Hochul had been in the process of implementing a new system for handling real estate documents when she left after being elected to Congress. Jacobs said that $9,000 were spent in overtime to deposit checks and file unopened documents that had accumulated in the interim period after Hochul's departure, while the office was adjusting to the new system.

U.S. House of Representatives (2011–2013)

Elections

2011 special

Hochul ran in the May 24, 2011, special election to fill the seat in New York's 26th congressional district left vacant by the resignation of Chris Lee. She was the Democratic Party and Working Families Party nominee. Hochul's residence in Hamburg, just outside the 26th district, became an issue during her campaign, though it did not disqualify her from seeking the seat. One month after her victory, she moved into the district.

The Republican and Conservative Party nominee, State Assemblymember Jane Corwin, was at first strongly favored to win in the Republican-leaning district, which had sent a Republican to Congress for the previous four decades. A late April poll had Corwin leading Hochul by 36% to 31%; Tea Party candidate Jack Davis trailed at 23%. An early May poll gave Hochul a lead of 35% to 31%, and shortly thereafter the nonpartisan Rothenberg Political Report called the race a toss-up. Additional polling in the days immediately before the election had Hochul leading by four- and six-point margins.

A Washington Post article noted that in the face of a possible Hochul victory, there was already a "full blown spin war" about the meaning of the result. The article said that Democrats viewed the close race as a result of Republicans' budget proposal The Path to Prosperity, and, in particular, their proposal for Medicare reform. Republicans viewed it as the result of Davis's third-party candidacy.

The campaign featured a number of negative television ads, with FactCheck accusing both sides of "taking liberties with the facts". In particular, FactCheck criticized the Democrats' ads for claiming that Corwin would "essentially end Medicare", even though the plan left Medicare intact for current beneficiaries. The organization also faulted the Republicans for ads portraying Hochul as a puppet of former Speaker Nancy Pelosi, and for claiming that Hochul planned to cut Social Security and Medicare benefits.

Hochul was endorsed by EMILY's List, a political action committee that supports Democratic women candidates who support abortion rights. She was the fifth largest recipient of EMILY's List funds in 2011, receiving more than $27,000 in bundled donations. The Democrat and Chronicle endorsed Hochul "for her tenacity and independence", while The Buffalo News endorsed her for her positions on preserving Medicare and her record of streamlining government.

Hochul defeated Corwin 47% to 42%, with Davis receiving 9% and Green Party candidate Ian Murphy 1%.

2012

Before the 2012 election, Hochul's district was renumbered the 27th during the redistricting process. The district was redrawn in a manner that caused it to be more heavily Republican. Hochul was endorsed by the National Rifle Association. She lost to Republican Chris Collins, 51% to 49%.

Tenure

In Hochul's first few weeks in office, she co-sponsored bills with Brian Higgins to streamline the passport acquisition process. She also met with then-President Barack Obama about the economy and job creation and introduced a motion to restore the Republican cuts to the Commodity Futures Trading Commission. She looked for ways to reduce the federal budget deficit and expressed support for reducing Medicaid spending as long as the reductions would not be achieved in the form of block grants offered to states, as proposed in the Republican budget blueprint. She also spoke with Obama about ending tax breaks for oil companies and protecting small businesses.

While campaigning for Congress, Hochul called herself an "independent Democrat". In an interview with the Lockport Union-Sun & Journal, she cited as examples of her independence her opposition to then-Governor Eliot Spitzer's driver's license program for undocumented immigrants and her opposition to then-Governor David Paterson's 2010 proposal to raise revenue by requiring all vehicle owners to buy new license plates.

Hochul was one of 17 Democrats to join Republicans in supporting a resolution finding United States Attorney General Eric Holder in contempt of Congress relating to the ATF gunwalking scandal, a vote on which the NRA, which supported the resolution, announced it would be scoring lawmakers. Later in 2012, Hochul "trumpeted" her endorsement by the NRA and noted that she was just one of two New York Democrats to receive its support.

Trade
On September 17, 2011, Robert J. McCarthy noted that Hochul and her election opponent Jack Davis agreed on their opposition to free trade. "We saw what happened with NAFTA; the promises never materialized," she said of the North American Free Trade Agreement. "If I have to stand up to my own party on this, I'm willing to do so."

Energy
During her congressional campaign, Hochul favored offering incentives to develop alternative energy.

In June 2011, Hochul opposed legislation that would cut funding for the Commodity Futures Trading Commission (CFTC) by 44%, on the grounds that the CFTC curbs speculation in oil and the resulting layoffs of CFTC personnel would "make it easier for Big Oil companies and speculators to take advantage of ... consumers".

Fiscal issues
While running for Congress, Hochul supported raising taxes on those making more than $500,000 per year. She opposed new free trade agreements then under consideration, saying, "We don't need to look any further than Western New York to see that these policies do not work." She believes that free trade agreements such as NAFTA and CAFTA have suppressed U.S. wages and benefits and caused job loss in the U.S.

Hochul acknowledged during her campaign that substantial cuts must be made in the federal budget, and said she would consider cuts in all entitlement programs. But she expressed opposition to the Republican plan that would turn Medicare into a voucher system, saying it "would end Medicare as we know it". She said money could be saved in the Medicare program by eliminating waste and purchasing prescription drugs in bulk, and that the creation of more jobs would alleviate Medicare and Social Security budget shortfalls due to increased collections of payroll taxes.

On November 19, 2011, Brian Tumulty of WGRZ reported that Hochul had voted for a balanced budget amendment, which she called "a bipartisan solution".

Health care
Hochul expressed support for the Affordable Care Act passed by the 111th Congress and said during her campaign that she would not vote to repeal it. In response to a constituent's question during a town-hall meeting in February 2012, she was booed for saying that the federal government was "not looking to the Constitution" under the Obama administration requirement that employers provide their workers with insurance coverage for birth control. A spokesman later said she had misspoken, but did not clarify her answer.

Social issues
Hochul has said she is pro-choice.

Committee assignments
 Committee on Armed Services
 Committee on Homeland Security
 Subcommittee on Counterterrorism and Intelligence
 Subcommittee on Emergency Preparedness, Response, and Communications

Lieutenant governor of New York (2015–2021)

Elections

2014

After her departure from Congress, Hochul worked as a government relations executive for the Buffalo-based M&T Bank.

In 2014, Robert Duffy announced that he would not run for reelection as lieutenant governor. Incumbent Governor Cuomo was running for a second term. After Duffy's announcement, Cuomo named Hochul as his choice for lieutenant governor. On May 22, 2014, the delegates to the state Democratic convention formally endorsed Hochul for lieutenant governor.

In September, Cuomo and Hochul won their Democratic primary elections, with Hochul defeating Timothy Wu. They were also the Working Families Party nominees. (In New York, candidates for governor and lieutenant governor are nominated separately, but run as a ticket in the general election.) In November, the Cuomo/Hochul ticket won the general election. Hochul was sworn in as lieutenant governor on January 1, 2015.

2018

In the 2018 Democratic primary for lieutenant governor of New York, Hochul defeated Jumaane Williams, a member of the New York City Council, 53.3%–46.7%. In the November 6 general election, the Cuomo-Hochul ticket defeated the Republican ticket of Marc Molinaro and Julie Killian, 59.6%–36.2%.

Tenure
Cuomo tasked Hochul with chairing the 10 regional economic development councils that are the centerpiece of the administration's economic development plan. The councils' goal is to build upon the strengths of each region to develop individualized long-term strategic plans.

Cuomo appointed Hochul to chair the Task Force on Heroin and Opioid Abuse and Addiction. In this capacity, she convened eight outreach sessions across New York State to hear from experts and community members in search of answers to the heroin crisis and works to develop a comprehensive strategy for New York.

Hochul spearheaded Cuomo's "Enough is Enough" campaign to combat sexual assault on college campuses beginning in 2015, hosting and attending more than 25 events. In March 2016, Cuomo named her to the New York State Women's Suffrage 100th Anniversary Commemoration Commission.

In 2018, Hochul supported legislation to provide driver's licenses to undocumented immigrants, which she had opposed as Erie County Clerk in 2007. While Hochul had said in 2007 that she would seek to have any such applicants arrested if the proposal was implemented, in 2018 she said circumstances had changed.

On May 30, 2018, State Senate Democrats hoped to force a vote on an abortion rights bill known as the Reproductive Health Act. Hochul was prepared to cast a tie-breaking vote on a hostile amendment; with one Republican senator away from Albany on military duty, the Senate Republican Conference and the Senate Democratic conference each had 31 members in the chamber. But Senate Republicans "abruptly shut down business and pulled all the bills for the day" when Hochul entered the Senate chamber. She called the GOP's actions "reprehensible" and "cowardly", adding, "The governor and I are offended by the actions taken here today in the Senate."

Hochul presided over the Senate chamber on June 5, 2018, when Senate Republicans called for the override of Cuomo's veto of a bill relating to full-day kindergarten classes. The override passed by a large margin, and was the first veto override to occur during Cuomo's gubernatorial tenure.

At a July 2018 rally with Planned Parenthood, Hochul called upon the Republican-led State Senate to reconvene in Albany to pass the Reproductive Health Act. She asserted that the potential confirmation of then-Supreme Court nominee Brett Kavanaugh made this necessary. The Act was reintroduced in January 2019 and passed the same month with wide margins in the state House and Senate.

Governor of New York (2021–present) 

In a press briefing on August 10, 2021, Andrew Cuomo announced his resignation as governor, effective August 24. Cuomo was accused of multiple instances of sexual misconduct. Hochul said New York attorney general Letitia James's report into Cuomo's behavior "documented repulsive and unlawful behavior" and praised his decision to resign. Of her time as lieutenant governor and relationship with Cuomo, Hochul has said: "I think it's very clear that the governor and I have not been close."

Hochul was sworn in as governor at 12:00 AM Eastern Time (ET) on August 24 by New York Chief Judge Janet DiFiore in a private ceremony. A public ceremonial event was held later that morning at the State Capitol's Red Room. Hochul is the state's first female governor. She is also the first New York governor from outside New York City and its immediate suburbs since 1932 (when Franklin Delano Roosevelt left office). Hochul also became the first governor from north of Hyde Park since Nathan L. Miller in 1922, in addition to being the first governor from Western New York since Horace White in 1910 and the first governor from Buffalo since Grover Cleveland in 1885. On August 12, Hochul confirmed that she planned to run for a full term as governor in 2022. She was the first Democrat to announce a 2022 gubernatorial candidacy after Cuomo said he would resign.
 
In August 2021, The Daily Beast and The Buffalo News reported on a potential conflict of interest between Hochul's role as governor and the high-level executive position held by her husband, William Hochul, at Delaware North, a Buffalo-based casino and hospitality company. Delaware North has stated that William Hochul will be prohibited from working on any matter that involves state business, oversight, or regulation. A spokesman for Kathy Hochul has said that she had a recusal policy as lieutenant governor and would maintain that policy as governor.

On August 26, 2021, Hochul appointed State Senator Brian Benjamin to the position of lieutenant governor of New York. Benjamin was sworn in on September 9, 2021.

In November 2021, Hochul pushed to end remote work during the COVID-19 pandemic and to return workers to offices. That same month, Hochul offered her plans to redevelop Manhattan's Pennsylvania Station and the surrounding neighborhood. In her plans, she called for reducing density in the area.

In December 2021, Hochul announced the reinstatement of an indoor mask mandate amid the spread of the Omicron variant.

In January 2022, she expanded an existing vaccine mandate for healthcare workers to include a booster shot requirement. Also in January 2022, Hochul confirmed that New York's eviction moratorium would expire on January 15. She announced that she would sign on to a letter with other governors to the federal government asking for more rent assistance, after New York received only $27.2 million of its nearly $1 billion request. Tenant advocates and other politicians have pushed her and state lawmakers to pass the Good Cause eviction bill, which would give tenants the right to a lease renewal in most cases, cap rent increases, and require landlords to obtain a judge's order to evict tenants.

In March 2022, Hochul reached an agreement with the Buffalo Bills to have taxpayers pay $850 million for the construction of a new stadium, as well as commit to maintain and repair the stadium. It was set to be the largest taxpayer contribution ever for a National Football League facility. The agreement was released four days before the state budget was due to be passed, making it hard for lawmakers to scrutinize. Critics of the agreement characterized it as corporate welfare. Part of the funding for the stadium came from a payment from the Seneca Nation of New York, whose bank accounts had been recently frozen as part of a long-running dispute between the Seneca Nation and the State of New York over the Seneca Nation's refusal to pay certain fees related to casino gaming despite being ordered to do so by multiple judicial bodies.

On April 12, 2022, Brian Benjamin resigned as lieutenant governor after having been indicted earlier that day on federal charges of bribery, conspiracy to commit wire fraud, wire fraud, and falsification of records. The crimes of which Benjamin is accused were allegedly committed during his State Senate tenure. He has pleaded not guilty to all charges.

On May 3, 2022, Hochul selected U.S. Representative Antonio Delgado to serve as lieutenant governor of New York. Delgado was sworn in on May 25.

On June 22, 2022, Hochul announced a $300 million plan to rebuild infrastructure in western New York communities with public and private funding.

In 2022, a citizens' group called Uniting NYS and a group of state legislators sued Hochul in the New York State Supreme Court in George M. Borrello et al. v. Kathleen C. Hochul et al. to prevent implementation of a recently created state department of health policy enabling health practitioners to refer even asymptomatic patients suspected of having been exposed to a contagious illness for possible involuntary detention backed by law enforcement, with the option of holding detainees incommunicado. The policy had been created without consulting the state legislature and did not require an emergency to be implemented. New York Supreme Court Justice Ronald Ploetz ruled against Hochul on the grounds of unconstitutionality under the separation of powers doctrine of both the state and federal constitutions, as well as on the grounds that the policy was cruel and lacked due process. The New York state attorney general and Hochul are filing an appeal to retain the regulations, and the appeal is being challenged.

In late 2022, Hochul delayed the signing of the Digital Fair Repair Act, a bill that received rare bipartisan support. The delay was allegedly due to major equipment manufacturers' lobbying efforts. On December 28, 2022, Hochul signed the Digital Fair Repair Act (Senate bill 4104-A) into law, but not before adding an amendment that equipment manufacturers "may provide assemblies of parts rather than individual components". Independent repair analysts such as Louis Rossmann have claimed these amendments undermine the bill's purpose, and allege codification into law of "unethical practices".

2022 election 

On February 17, 2022, the New York State Democratic Convention endorsed Hochul for governor. As of February 2022, she had raised $21 million in campaign funds. Hochul won a full term in office, defeating Republican nominee Lee Zeldin in the closest New York gubernatorial election since 1994 and the closest Democratic victory since 1982. Hochul's election marked the first time a woman was elected governor of New York.

First full term 
Hochul was inaugurated to her first full term as governor on January 1, 2023. One of her first actions was to nominate Hector LaSalle for the vacant position of chief judge of the New York Court of Appeals. LaSalle's nomination drew opposition from a wide variety of Democratic groups and constituencies, including numerous unions and trade groups, criminal justice advocates, elected officeholders, and local party affiliates, who raised concerns about his track record on issues relating to abortion, criminal justice, corporate interests, and the environment. Many also suggested that he would do little to stem – or potentially accelerate – the Court of Appeals' rightward drift under the previous chief judge, Janet DiFiore. Despite an extensive lobbying campaign by allies of Hochul, including support from U.S. House Minority Leader Hakeem Jeffries, LaSalle's nomination was rejected by the Senate Judiciary Committee in a 10-9 vote. Hochul subsequently sued to demand a full floor vote. Democratic leadership then chose to hold a full Senate floor vote, which overwhelmingly rejected LaSalle's nomination.

Personal life
Hochul is married to William J. Hochul Jr., the former United States Attorney for the Western District of New York, who is also the senior vice president, general counsel, and secretary to Delaware North, a hospitality and gambling company. They have two children. Hochul is Catholic.

Hochul is a founder of Kathleen Mary House, a transitional home for women and children who are victims of domestic violence. She has served on the organization's board. She also co-founded the Village Action Coalition, and, as of 2011, was a member of the board of trustees of Immaculata Academy in Hamburg, New York.

Electoral history

See also
 List of current United States governors
 List of female governors in the United States
 List of female lieutenant governors in the United States
 Women in the United States House of Representatives

References

External links

 Governor Kathy Hochul official government website
 Kathy Hochul for Governor campaign website
 Congresswoman Kathy Hochul U.S. House website (archived)

 

|-

|-

|-

|-

|-

|-

|-

1958 births
2016 United States presidential electors
2020 United States presidential electors
21st-century American politicians
21st-century American women politicians
American people of Irish descent
American Roman Catholics
American women lawyers
Columbus School of Law alumni
Catholics from New York (state)
County clerks in New York (state)
Democratic Party members of the United States House of Representatives from New York (state)
Democratic Party governors of New York (state)
Female members of the United States House of Representatives
Lieutenant Governors of New York (state)
Living people
Maxwell School of Citizenship and Public Affairs alumni
New York (state) lawyers
People from Amherst, New York
Politicians from Buffalo, New York
Women in New York (state) politics
Women state governors of the United States